Adult Trainee is a South Korean web series directed by Yoo Hak-chan and Jeong Hyeong-gun, starring Ryu Ui-hyun, Cho Mi-yeon, Jo Yoo-jung, Ryeoun, Kwon Young-eun, and Kim Min-gi. The series depicts a pink comedy about Generation Z who have grown up. This multi-part series was released on TVING starting with episodes "Jae-min" on November 12, "Yu-ra" on November 19 and "Na-eun" on November 26, 2021.

Synopsis
The series follows a group of young people and their struggles with love, and it's divided in three parts.

The first part tells the story of Jae-min (Ryu Ui-hyun), a student addicted to masturbation and accepts the "Stop Masturbation in a 100 Days Challenge" in order to confess to the girl he likes, Ye-kyung (Cho Mi-yeon).

The second part tells the story of Yu-ra (Jo Yoo-jung), a wannabe girl crush, but in reality, a naive and delicate religious girl who dreams of a dangerous and bizarre departure from her boyfriend, Nam-ho (Ryeoun). A fluttering change comes between the two as Nam-ho, a boy Yu-ra had no interest in, starts to look sexy at some point.

The third and last part is the story of the mysterious J, who appeared in front of Na-eun (Kwon Young-eun), an overweight girl who has never received anyone's attention, and thus decides to find J's identity.

Cast

Main 
 Ryu Ui-hyun as Seo Jae-min
A skinny boy sensitive to skinship and addicted to masturbation.
 Cho Mi-yeon as Bang Ye-kyung
Jae-min's classmate.
 Jo Yoo-jung as Yu-ra
A conservative girl who starts a dangerous departure from her boyfriend.
 Ryeoun as Nam-ho
 Yu-ra's handsome boyfriend.
 Kwon Young-eun as Son Na-eun
An overweight, sensitive and imaginative girl who is looking for a boyish boyfriend.
 Kim Min-gi as Choi Kang-joon
A popular idol-turned-student.

Supporting 
 Kang Yi-seok as Kim Sung-jae
"Stop Masturbation" club leader.
 Lee Chan-hyung as Song Yi-joon
 Jang Sung-yoon as Song Hye-bin
 Park Se-hyun as Kang Da-hyun
 Jo Sung-joon as Jin Beom

Special appearance 
 Lee Seon-hee as Na-eun's mother
 Lee Hwi-won
 Song Chae-yoon
 Kim Han-jong
 Yoo Ji-yeon

Production
The series, directed by Yoo Hak-chan and Jeong Hyeong-gun, was first announced on October 13, 2021, with the release of a provocative teaser poster.

The writers of the series, Kim Hyeon-min, Bang So-min, and Jin Yun-ju, won the CJ ENM's O'PEN contest, a project that supports new storytellers.

References

External links
 

South Korean web series
South Korean drama web series
2021 web series debuts
TVING original programming